Diogo de Arruda (before 1490 – 1531) was a noted Portuguese architect that was active during the early years of the 16th century. He had some other important family members including his brother, Francisco de Arruda and his uncle, Miguel de Arruda.

Arruda designed the well-known chapter house window at the Convent of Christ, in Tomar.

Notes

Bibliography

 Pereira, Paulo, 2004: The work of brothers Diogo and Francisco de Arruda in Torre de Belém. Scala Publishers

External links
 Convento de Cristo: article on Diogo de Arruda 

Manueline architects
15th-century births
1531 deaths
Portuguese architects
Place of birth unknown
Place of death unknown
16th-century Portuguese people